Izak Burger (born 20 August 1998) is a South African rugby union player for the  in the United Rugby Championship and the  in the Currie Cup. His regular position is scrum-half.

Honours
 SuperSport Rugby Challenge winner 2019
 Currie Cup winner 2021
 Pro14 Rainbow Cup runner-up 2021
 United Rugby Championship runner-up 2021-22

References

South African rugby union players
Living people
1998 births
Rugby union scrum-halves
Griquas (rugby union) players
South Africa Under-20 international rugby union players
Bulls (rugby union) players
Blue Bulls players